Adrian Świątek  (born 22 July 1986) is a Polish footballer who plays for German club FSG Ostseeküste. His position on the pitch is attacker.

Career

Club
In the past he played for UKS SMS Łódź, Stal Głowno, ŁKS Łódź and Piast Gliwice.

In February 2010, he signed a three-year contract with Górnik Zabrze.

In February 2011, he was loaned to Ruch Radzionków on a half-year deal.

On 20 July 2020, he returned to German Verbandsliga Schleswig-Holstein-Ost amateur side Schleswig 06.
Since 2021 he is playing for the German Club FSG Ostseeküste

References

External links 
 

1986 births
Footballers from Poznań
Living people
Polish footballers
Association football forwards
Stal Głowno players
ŁKS Łódź players
Piast Gliwice players
Górnik Zabrze players
Ruch Radzionków players
Sandecja Nowy Sącz players
Polonia Środa Wielkopolska players
Ekstraklasa players
I liga players
II liga players
III liga players
Polish expatriate footballers
Expatriate footballers in Germany